Neopseustis calliglauca is a species of moth belonging to the family Neopseustidae. It was described by Edward Meyrick in 1909. It is known only from the Khasi Hills of north-eastern India.

The wingspan is 15–17.2 mm. Adults have been found at a very restricted area just above a stream at the top of a fruit garden. They were found during the day, resting on leaves and closely resembled birds' droppings.

References

Neopseustidae